The Gotisch huis (English:Gothic house) is one of the oldest buildings in the city of Groningen, Netherlands. It is a rijksmonument since 1971. Built in the 14th century it is widely seen as the oldest residential building remaining in the city, this fact was mentioned when it became a rijksmonument, even though the Calmershuis that was built in 1250, and mentioned as being a mayor's  house, is older.  Together with the nextdoor building, the Canterhuis, it is currently in use by the Northern  Maritime Museum. 

Buildings and structures in Groningen (city)
Rijksmonuments in Groningen (province)